Sara Arfeen Khan is an Indian actress and television host. She is best known for her role as Alka Tiwari in STAR One's hit serial Dhoondh Legi Manzil' Humein and host in 'kahi suni' hit travel show of epic channel and Love Ka Hai Intezaar as Maharani Vijayalakshmi Ranawat.

Television

Films

References

External links

Actresses in Hindi cinema
21st-century Indian actresses
Actresses from Mumbai
Living people
Actresses in Hindi television
Year of birth missing (living people)